The 1995–96 Cypriot Fourth Division was the 10th season of the Cypriot fourth-level football league. Iraklis Gerolakkou won their 2nd title. The first 3 teams were promoted to the 1995–96 Cypriot Third Division. The last three teams were relegated to regional leagues.

See also
 Cypriot Fourth Division
 1995–96 Cypriot First Division
 1995–96 Cypriot Cup

Cypriot Fourth Division seasons
Cyprus
1995–96 in Cypriot football